Oophaga is a genus of poison-dart frogs containing twelve species, many of which were formerly placed in the genus Dendrobates. The frogs are distributed in Central and South America, from Nicaragua through the Colombian El Choco to northern Ecuador (at elevations below ). Their habitats vary with some species being arboreal while other being terrestrial, but the common feature is that their tadpoles are obligate egg feeders.

Etymology
Oophaga, Greek for "egg eater" (oon), is descriptive of the tadpoles' diet.

Reproduction
While presumably all dendrobatids show parental care, this is unusually advanced in Oophaga: the tadpoles feed exclusively on trophic (unfertilized) eggs supplied as food by the mother; the father is not involved. Through the eggs, the mother also passes defensive toxins to the tadpoles: Oophaga pumilio tadpoles experimentally fed with eggs from alkaloid-free frogs did not contain alkaloids.

Species
There are twelve species in this genus:

Captivity
Oophaga may be kept as pets by experienced amphibian keepers, but they are challenging to breed in captivity as only parents can feed and care for tadpoles.

References

 
Poison dart frogs
Amphibians of Central America
Amphibians of South America
Amphibian genera